I Still Believe in Fairy Tales is the fourteenth studio album by American country music singer-songwriter Tammy Wynette. It was released on September 8, 1975, by Epic Records.

Commercial performance 
The album peaked at No. 24 on the Billboard Country Albums chart. The album's only single, "I Still Believe in Fairy Tales", peaked at No. 13 on the Billboard Country Singles chart.

Track listing

Personnel
Adapted from the album liner notes.
Lou Bradley - engineer
The Nashville Edition - backing vocals
Billy Sherrill - producer
Tammy Wynette - lead vocals

Chart positions

Album

Singles

References

1975 albums
Tammy Wynette albums
Epic Records albums
Albums produced by Billy Sherrill